Hammett is an unincorporated community in Elmore County, Idaho, United States. Hammett is located on Idaho State Highway 78 8.5 miles (13.7 km) west of Glenns Ferry. Hammett has a post office with ZIP Code 83627.

History
Hammett's population was 75 in 1960.

References

Unincorporated communities in Elmore County, Idaho
Unincorporated communities in Idaho